The Owl (French: La Chouette) is a series of short CGI-animated episodes for children's television. It is a silent comedy revolving around the life of an unlucky owl, who has trouble dealing with all sorts of surreal situations and gets comically dismembered at the end.

Plot 
The series features the eponymous Owl, pink in color, and with blue feet that "float" below his body. The Owl also resembles a plastic figure and has a grumpy, anti-social personality. Each of the minute-long fifty-four episodes centers on the Owl attempting to overcome unfortunate circumstances, but as a running gag, end in his demise by his various appendages and body being dispensed of in unusual or comical ways.

The series' setting only takes place high above at a nondescript tree, a la a "bottle show". The Owl occasionally also encounters other species, like other birds, bats and even an athletic frog, to which these never end well for him. Other situations also involve surreal events, like floating objects and exploding apples. Some episodes even have references to pop culture, like the video game franchise Tetris.

Episodes

See also
 The Owl & Co – A serialized spinoff, featuring more prominent characters in a large forest setting also made by Studio Hari.

References

External links
 Official website

2003 French television series debuts
2006 French television series endings
2000s French animated television series
French computer-animated television series
French children's animated comedy television series
Fictional owls
Animated television series about birds
Animated television series without speech